David Koehler (born December 16, 1948) is a Democratic politician from Illinois, and has been the Illinois State Senator from 46th Legislative District since December 2006. The district includes Canton, East Peoria, Fairview, Lewistown, Mapleton, Peoria, Pekin and West Peoria.

Biographical background
Koehler was born and raised in South Dakota.  He graduated from Yankton College in South Dakota (Bachelor of Arts, 1971) and United Theological Seminary in Dayton, Ohio (Master of Divinity).

He was a staff member at the National Farm Worker Ministry (NFWM) from 1972 to 1978 working in Arizona, Ohio, New York, and eventually at the United Farm Workers La Paz headquarters in Keene, California.

He moved to Peoria, Illinois in 1978, and became a community organizer manager and for the Peoria Friendship House, a local charity.  He became executive director of the Peoria Area Labor Management Council (PALM) in 1985, and president of its Labor Management Cooperative Health Programs in 1992.

His wife is Nora Sullivan.  They live in Peoria, and started Peoria Bread Company, a bakery, in 2006.

Koehler is a retired minister in the United Church of Christ.

Political career
Koehler was on the Peoria County Board from 1982 to 1988, and Peoria City Council from 1989 to 1997.   While on the city council, he was mayor pro tem for two years.

Koehler was elected to the Illinois Senate in November 2006; his predecessor, George Shadid, retired in December 2006, allowing Koehler to take office in on December 3, 2006. He was re-elected uncontested in 2010.

In early 2010, Koehler and other lawmakers called for the elimination of the position of Illinois Lieutenant Governor. After candidate Scott Lee Cohen, the Democratic primary winner for Lieutenant Governor, dropped out, Koehler applied to be considered for that seat as running mate in Governor Pat Quinn's first election campaign after succeeding to the governorship.  Sheila Simon was selected by the Democratic State Central Committee instead, and won the election.

During the 96th Illinois General Assembly, Koehler was the chair of the Local Government Committee and of the Subcommittee on Fertilizers and Chemicals (of the Agriculture and Conservation Committee).  He is also Vice-Chair of the Energy Committee.  In the 97th General Assembly, he was once again chair of the Local Government Committee and chair of vice-chair of the Energy Committee.

Saying he had a good team and was pleased by the results, Sen. Koehler defeated his Republican opponent for a second four-year term in the Nov. 2012 general election, Peoria-area businessman and developer Pat Sullivan, by a margin of 39,149 to 31,684 — or a 55 percent to 45 percent margin, with Tazewell County unable to provide complete results late Tuesday. His priorities are pension reform and tax code changes, civil unions, passing of concealed carry, and containing the budget and a backlog of unpaid bills.

Koehler was reelected to a fourth term in 2016. In 2018, J.B. Pritzker appointed Koehler to Powering Illinois’ Future transition committee, which is responsible for infrastructure and clean energy policies. He defeated Mary Burress in the 2020 general election, winning a fifth term in the Illinois State Senate.

As of July 2022, Senator Koehler is a member of the following Illinois Senate committee:

 Agriculture Committee (SAGR)
 (Chairman of) Appropriations - Agriculture, Environment & Energy Committee (SAPP-SAAE)
 Appropriations - Health Committee (SAPP-SAHA)
 Appropriations Committee (SAPP)
 Education Committee (SESE)
 Energy and Public Utilities Committee (SENE)
 Health Committee (SHEA)
 Labor Committee (SLAB)
 (Co-chairman of) Labor - Special Issues Committee (SLAB-SLSI)
 Redistricting - East Central and Southeastern Illinois Committee (SRED-SRSE)
 Redistricting - Northern Illinois Committee (SRED-SRNI)
 (Chairman of) Redistricting - West Central Illinois Committee (SRED-SRWC)
 Subcommittee on Next Generation Nuclear (SENE-SNGN)
 Subcommittee on Managed Care Organizations (SHEA-SMCO)
 (Chairman of) Subcommittee on Public Health (SHEA-SHPH)

References

External links
Biography, bills and committees at the 98th Illinois General Assembly
By session: 98th, 97th,  96th, 95th, 94th
State Senator David Koehler constituency site
 
Senator Dave Koehler at Illinois Senate Democrats

1948 births
Living people
American clergy
County board members in Illinois
Illinois city council members
Democratic Party Illinois state senators
People from South Dakota
Politicians from Peoria, Illinois
United Church of Christ ministers
United Theological Seminary alumni
21st-century American politicians
Peoria, Illinois City Council members